María Candelaria Acevedo Sáez (born 12 September 1958) is a Chilean politician from the Communist Party of Chile.

She is the daughter of Sebastián Acevedo, who set himself on fire in November 1983.

See also 

 LVI legislative period of the Chilean Congress

References 

Living people
1958 births

Communist Party of Chile politicians
21st-century Chilean politicians
21st-century Chilean women politicians
Women members of the Chamber of Deputies of Chile
Deputies of the LVI Legislative Period of the National Congress of Chile
Chilean human rights activists
Chilean communists